The Stade Félix-Houphouët-Boigny, nicknamed Le Félicia, is a multi-purpose stadium, which can host football, rugby union and athletics, in Abidjan, Ivory Coast. It is the national stadium of the Ivory Coast national football team. It is named after the first president of the country, Félix Houphouët-Boigny, and is located in the commune of Le Plateau. The stadium has a capacity of 50,000. It also hosts matches of ASEC Abidjan. It has been the site of several deadly stampedes.

History
Built in 1964 to organize the "Games of Abidjan", the stadium was formerly known as Stade Andre Geo, and it took the name of the President Felix Houphouet-Boigny after undergoing restoration.

Gradually it emerged as the National Stadium, hosting the ASEC Mimosas and Ivorian Soccer Team.

Along the Stadium of Peace of Bouake, Stade Felix Houphouet-Boigny hosted Africa Cup of Nations soccer. In 2009 after a complete renovation, which included lawn seating and the treatment room, the stadium hosted the 2009 African Championship of Nations.

The stadium was renovated for the 2017 Jeux de la Francophonie.

The stadium played host to Amnesty International's Human Rights Now! Benefit Concert on October 9, 1988. The show was headlined by Sting and Peter Gabriel and also featured Bruce Springsteen & The E Street Band, Tracy Chapman and Youssou N'Dour.

The American singer Chris Brown finished his Carpe Diem Tour at this stadium on December 30, 2012.

Incidents
On March 29, 2009, during the match between Ivory Coast and Malawi, the gateway to an open corner of the stadium gave way before the kick-off of the match. A stampede ensued when 19 people were killed by trampling. Over 130 were injured as well.

On January 1, 2013, following a New Year's Eve fireworks display, another stampede took place, in which sixty-one lives were claimed, with upwards of 200 injuries sustained.

2020 Renovations
Renovations for the 2023 Africa Cup of Nations are expected to begin in April 2020 and take 16 months. The renovation will be performed by Mota-Engil and is expected to include the installation of a complete roof and an increase in capacity.

Structure
The bleachers painted in national colors consist of curves, the gallery lagoon side of the podium, a gallery and a presidential box, VIP, and BVIP .

The stage contains a media room, a room control used for anti-doping, a VIP room, a treatment room, offices of arbitrators, a massage room, and four dressing rooms.

The stadium has a video board 220 volts for 35 kwh, 16.50 meters by 5.70 meters.

The lawn is of international standard and is maintained daily green and glowing.

References

External links

Photo at worldstadiums.com
Photos at fussballtempel.net
Photos at cafe.daum.net/stade

Athletics (track and field) venues in Ivory Coast
Football venues in Ivory Coast
National stadiums
Sport in Abidjan
Multi-purpose stadiums
Sports venues completed in 1964
Buildings and structures in Abidjan
1964 establishments in Ivory Coast
2023 Africa Cup of Nations stadiums